S. Shangumuthu Thevar was an Indian politician and former Member of the Legislative Assembly.People called him Sattaiadi Shanmuga Thever. He was elected to the Tamil Nadu legislative assembly as an Indian National Congress (Organisation) candidate from Ambasamudram constituency in 1971 election.

References 

Indian National Congress (Organisation) politicians
Year of birth missing
Year of death missing
Tamil Nadu MLAs 1971–1976
Indian National Congress politicians from Tamil Nadu